The Eternal Conflict is a fantasy novel by author David H. Keller, M.D. It was first published in 1949 by Prime Press in an edition of 400 copies, all of which were signed, numbered and slipcased.  The novel was originally serialized in French in Le Primaires under the title Le Duel Sans Fin, in 1939.

Plot introduction
The novel concerns two conflicts.  One is between the sexes, the other in a woman's mind.

References

1949 American novels
American fantasy novels
Novels first published in serial form